Trango Glacier  is a glacier in the Baltoro Muztagh range of the Karakoram in Baltistan, Gilgit-Baltistan, Pakistan.

Geography 
It flows from north to south on the west side of the Trango Towers and joins the Baltoro Glacier.

See also 
 Hainablak Glacier
 Trango Towers
 List of mountains in Pakistan
 List of highest mountains
 List of glaciers

References 

Glaciers of the Karakoram
Glaciers of Gilgit-Baltistan